Jake Kerr may refer to:

 Jake Kerr (businessman) (born 1944), Canadian executive
 Jake Kerr (rugby union) (born 1996), Scottish rugby union player